HaKol HaYehudi (lit, "The Jewish Voice") is an Israeli digital newspaper in Hebrew. The paper is written and edited in Yitzhar, by Avraham Binyamin and Yehoshua Hess, who were both convicted of incitement. The paper contains news, as well as political, and religious commentary. It has been described as right-wing and far-right. It is also considered ultra-Orthodox. It has been associated with the settler movement. HaKol HaYehudi has multiple writers, including Meir Ettinger, and the controversial religious leader Rabbi Yosef Elitzur, who co-authored the King's Torah. The paper is affiliated with Rabbi Yitzchak Ginsburgh. In 2011, police raided Yitzhar, and the headquarters of the news-site. In 2018, they raised 348,885 NIS through crowd-funding to start an "investigative system", successfully passing their goal of 320,000 NIS. The newspaper is affiliated with Otzma Yehudit.

References

External links 
Official website (Hebrew)

Israeli news websites
Far-right politics in Israel